Shropshire Constabulary was the territorial police force responsible for policing rural Shropshire in central England from 1840 until 1967, when it became part of West Mercia Constabulary.

History
The Shropshre Constabulary was formed along with borough forces in the towns of Shrewsbury, Bridgnorth, Ludlow, Much Wenlock and Oswestry. In the early years they were known as ‘Paddy Mayne’s grasshoppers’ and rabbits because the first Chief Constable was Irish and the constables wore green uniforms. The headquarters were at 27, Swan Hill, Shrewsbury.

In 1947 the Shropshire Constabulary absorbed Shrewsbury Borough Constabulary. On 1 October 1967 the Shropshire Constabulary was amalgamated with the Worcestershire Constabulary, Herefordshire Constabulary and Worcester City Police to form the West Mercia Constabulary, later the West Mercia Police.

Chief Constables
 1840–1859 : Captain Dawson Mayne (first Chief Constable of Shropshire)
 1859–1864 : Captain Philip Henry Crampton
 1864–1866 : Colonel Edward B. Cureton
 c.1870 : Colonel R. J. Edgell
 1890–1905 : Captain George Williams Freeman
 1905–1908 : Major Llewellyn William Atcherley (later Sir Llewellyn Acherley)
 1908–1914 : Gerard Lysley Derriman (killed in action, WW1, 1915)
 1916–1918 : A. Wood-Acton
 1918–1935 : Major Jack Becke
 1935–1946 : Lt Colonel Harold A. Golden
5 February 1946–6 February 1946 : Anthony Tew
 1946–1962 : Douglas Osmond (later Sir Douglas Osmond)
 1962–1967 : Robert George Fenwick
 1967 : Merged with other forces to form West Mercia Constabulary

References

Government agencies established in 1840
Organisations based in Shropshire
Defunct police forces of England
1840 establishments in England
1967 disestablishments in England